"Sweet and Lovely" is an American popular song of 1931, composed by Gus Arnheim, Charles N. Daniels, and Harry Tobias.

Recordings of the song which charted in 1931 are:
 Gus Arnheim & His Cocoanut Grove Orchestra with a vocal refrain by Donald Novis – #1 on the charts for 14 weeks
 Guy Lombardo & His Royal Canadians – #2
 Bing Crosby – #9 – recorded September 14, 1931 with Victor Young and His Orchestra.  (this was reissued in 1944 and briefly charted at No. 27)
 Ben Bernie & His Orchestra – #12
 Russ Columbo – #19

Other recordings
Denny Dennis – with Jay Wilbur and his Orchestra (1940) 
Flip Phillips Fliptet - recorded on October 9, 1944, released later as a 78 (Signature 90003)
Thelonious Monk – for his 1952 album Thelonious Monk Trio 
Bing Crosby – for his 1954 album Bing: A Musical Autobiography
Gerry Mulligan – for his 1955 album Presenting the Gerry Mulligan Sextet
Vince Guaraldi – for his 1956 album Vince Guaraldi Trio
Cecil Taylor – for his 1956 debut album Jazz Advance
Gerry Mulligan – for his 1957 album Mulligan Meets Monk
Les Paul – for his 1957 album Time to Dream 
Milt Jackson – for his 1958 album Bags & Flutes
Keely Smith – for her 1958 album Politely! 
Jerry Vale – for his 1958 album I Remember Russ 
Ella Fitzgerald – for her 1959 album Ella Fitzgerald Sings Sweet Songs for Swingers
Bill Evans Trio - for their 1961 album Explorations
Stan Kenton – for his 1961 album The Romantic Approach
April Stevens & Nino Tempo - charted July 1962
Thelonious Monk – for his 1962 quartet album Monk's Dream
Lou Donaldson – for his 1967 album Lush Life (orchestrated)
Phineas Newborn Jr. recorded in 1969 and released on his 1975 album Harlem Blues
Bryan Ferry – for his 1999 album As Time Goes By

References

1931 songs
Songs with music by Charles N. Daniels (music)
Songs with lyrics by Harry Tobias
Songs written by Gus Arnheim
Guy Lombardo songs